Furuichi Station is a Hiroshima Rapid Transit station on Astram Line, located in Nakasu, Asaminami-ku, Hiroshima.

Platforms

Connections
█ Astram Line
●Nakasuji — ●Furuichi — ●Ōmachi

Around station
Furuichi Post Office
Nakasu Bus stop

History
Opened on August 20, 1994.

See also
Astram Line
Hiroshima Rapid Transit

References 

Furuichi Station